Anita Ann Howard Prather (born March 22, 1969), née Anita Ann Howard, is a former American track and field athlete who specialized in the 400 meters.

Howard received an athletic scholarship to attend the University of Florida in Gainesville, Florida, where she was a member of the Florida Gators track and field team from 1988 to 1991. She graduated from Florida with a bachelor's degree in psychology in 1993, and was inducted into the University of Florida Athletic Hall of Fame as a "Gator Great" in 2007.

Howard won a silver medal in the 4 x 400 meters relay at the 1997 World Indoor Championships in Paris, together with teammates Shanelle Porter, Natasha Kaiser-Brown and Jearl Miles-Clark. The team set a new North American indoor record of 3:27.66 minutes.

Her personal best in the 400 meters was a time of 51.01 seconds, which she ran in Austin, Texas in June 1992.

Anita Howard now works for Lennard Highschool as a HOPE Teacher.

See also 

 Florida Gators
 List of University of Florida alumni
 List of University of Florida Athletic Hall of Fame members
 List of University of Florida Olympians

References 

1969 births
Living people
American female sprinters
Florida Gators women's track and field athletes
Athletes (track and field) at the 1991 Pan American Games
Pan American Games medalists in athletics (track and field)
Pan American Games bronze medalists for the United States
Universiade medalists in athletics (track and field)
Universiade gold medalists for the United States
World Athletics Indoor Championships medalists
Medalists at the 1989 Summer Universiade
Medalists at the 1991 Summer Universiade
Medalists at the 1991 Pan American Games